is a Japanese professional footballer who plays as a midfielder for  club Yokohama FC.

Career

Youth career
Hasegawa begin career with Juntendo University in 2012 as youth team.

Senior career
After Graduation in 2015, Hasegawa begin first professional career with J1 club, Kawasaki Frontale in 2016. In 2022, he joined J2 club, Yokohama FC. On 23 October 2022, he brought his club promotion to J1 for upcoming 2023 season as well as finished in runner-up. He won J2 League Best XI in 2022.

Career statistics
.

Club

Honours

Club
J1 League (4) : 2017, 2018, 2020, 2021
Emperor's Cup (1) : 2020
J.League Cup (1) : 2019
Japanese Super Cup (1) : 2021

Individual
J2 League Best XI: 2022

References

External links
Profile at Yokohama FC

1994 births
Living people
Juntendo University alumni
Association football people from Shizuoka Prefecture
Japanese footballers
J1 League players
J2 League players
Kawasaki Frontale players
Yokohama FC players
Association football midfielders
Universiade bronze medalists for Japan
Universiade medalists in football